This is a list of Tamil population per nation.

See also
 List of countries and territories where Tamil is an official language
 Tamil population by cities
 States of India by Tamil speakers

Notes

References